Bour may refer to:

People
Justin Bour, professional baseball player for the Los Angeles Angels

Places
 Bour, Luxembourg, a village in Tuntange, Luxembourg.
 Bøur, a village in Sørvágs, the Faroe Islands
 M'bour, a town in Senegal

Other uses
 Bour (surname)
 , the Romanian name of the aurochs
 Maad a Sinig, a Serer royal title sometimes called Bour Sine
 Maad Saloum, a Serer royal title sometimes called Bour Saloum